Cooperative School or variant, refer schools named Co-Operative. It may refer to:

 cooperative school, a type of school in the UK
 Cooperative High School, New Haven, Connecticut, USA
 Paris Cooperative High School, Paris, Illinois, USA
 Majuro Cooperative School, Majuro, Marshall Islands; a pre-K--to--grade-12 school
 Cochabamba Cooperative School, Cochabamba, Bolivia

 American Cooperative School (disambiguation)
 Co-operative University (disambiguation)

See also

 cooperative learning
 co-operative education
 co-operative studies
 Co-operative College, a British school charity
 Cooperativeness
 Cooperative
 Cooperative (disambiguation)
 School (disambiguation)
 Coop (disambiguation)

Wikipedia disambiguation